Jamshid Qarin Ghuri was an Iranian military commander from Khurasan, who served as the darugha (military governor) of the city of Sari in Mazandaran under Timur after its capture in 1393. After Jamshid's death, he was succeeded by his son Shams al-Din.

References

Sources 
 
 

14th-century Iranian people
Generals of the Timurid Empire
Governors of the Timurid Empire
14th-century births

Year of birth unknown
Year of death unknown